Ely Racecourse was a horse racing venue in the Ely district of Cardiff, Wales. The racecourse opened in 1855, with the first race being held on 30 May. By 1864 racing at Ely was a regular event, the races that year were acclaimed as 'the most brilliant and successful ever held'.

History
In 1895 the first Welsh Grand National was held at the Ely Racecourse. It was watched by over 40,000 people, many of whom did not pay for entry after charging the entry gates and overpowering the stewards.

In the early 1900s attendance figures began to steadily decline and the racecourse never fully recovered from a fire that destroyed the grandstand in 1937.

The last race to be held there, in 1939, was won by Grasshopper, ridden by Keith Piggott, father of the famous jockey Lester Piggott.

Trelai Park is now on the site of the racecourse.

Further reading

See also
Sport in Cardiff

References

Defunct horse racing venues in Wales
History of Cardiff
Sports venues in Cardiff
Defunct sports venues in Wales
Sports venues completed in 1855